Jacob D. Leighty (November 15, 1839 – October 18, 1912) was a U.S. Representative from Indiana.  He had previously served with the Union Army during the American Civil War.

Early life and Union Army service
Born near Greensburg, Pennsylvania on November 15, 1839, Leighty moved with his parents to De Kalb County, Indiana in 1844, settling on a farm at Spencerville.  Educated at public schools, he then spent two years at a commercial school at Fort Wayne following which he entered Wittenberg College, in Springfield, Ohio.

On July 1, 1861, after two years in college, he enlisted in the Union Army, becoming a member of Company E, Eleventh Indiana Volunteer Zouave Infantry.  He served during the American Civil War.

Later life and congressional term

After the war, Leighty engaged in farming and general merchandising with his father until 1875, when he established the town of St. Joe, in Indiana.  He served as a member of the State house of representatives from 1886 to 1888, and later was elected as a Republican to the Fifty-fourth Congress (March 4, 1895 – March 4, 1897).  He was an unsuccessful candidate for reelection in 1896 to the Fifty-fifth Congress.

Leighty later worked as a United States pension agent at Indianapolis from 1897 to 1901.

Death 
He died at St. Joe, De Kalb County, Indiana, on October 18, 1912, and is interred in Riverview Cemetery.

See also
Union Army
55th United States Congress

References
 Retrieved on 2008-11-05

1839 births
1912 deaths
Wittenberg University alumni
People from Westmoreland County, Pennsylvania
Union Army soldiers
People of Indiana in the American Civil War
19th-century American politicians
Republican Party members of the United States House of Representatives from Indiana